Mikhaylov (masculine) or Mikhaylova (feminine) may refer to:

Places
Mikhaylov (inhabited locality), name of several inhabited localities in Russia
Mikhaylov Island, an island in the West Ice Shelf in Antarctica
Knez Mihailova, the main pedestrian street in Belgrade
Mikhailov Peninsula, a small peninsula on the western coast of the Taymyr Peninsula, Russia

Other uses
Mikhaylov (surname)
1910 Mikhailov, an asteroid discovered by Lyudmila Zhuravlyova in 1972
Mikhailov case, a 2010s espionage scandal in Russia

See also
 Michael (disambiguation)
 Mikhaylovsk
 Mikhaylovsky (disambiguation)
 Mikhaylovka (disambiguation)

Surnames from given names